Alexander Gordon Stephen, JP (14 September 1862 – 27 August 1924) was the chief manager of the Hongkong and Shanghai Banking Corporation.

Biography
He was born in Banff, Aberdeenshire on 14 September 1862. After he served an apprenticeship at the Town and Country Bank in Aberdeen, he joined the London office of the Hongkong and Shanghai Banking Corporation in 1882. He arrived in Hong Kong on 27 August 1885. He was transferred to Batavia, Singapore and the Bombay office, and stationed in Batavia from 1896 to 1902 until he was appointed agent at Penang. He became manager in the Manila branch and undertook a tour of inspection of the North China branches. He was then appointed manager in Shanghai in 1912 and acted as chief manager in Hong Kong for a few months during the absence of Newton John Stabb in London. He subsequently returned to Shanghai as a manager until he succeeded as chief manager on the retirement of Newton John Stabb in 1920.

He also held many public offices in Hong Kong. He was appointed as unofficial member of the Executive Council and Legislative Council and made a Justice of Peace in 1921. He was a member of both Court and Council of the University of Hong Kong. He was also a member of the general committee of the Hong Kong General Chamber of Commerce.

He also enjoyed many popular wins in Shanghai and Hong Kong as a steward of the Hong Kong Jockey Club with Stephen and Stitt.

Leaving in May 1924 for London due to illness, he died from pneumonia due to infarct of the lung at a London nursing home at the night of 27 August. The funeral took place on 2 September at the Kensal Green Cemetery.

HSBC's principal offices, including the HSBC Main Building in Hong Kong, the former office in Shanghai, and the current global headquarters in London, all feature a pair of bronze lions. The first of these, in Shanghai, were commissioned by Stephen and inspired by his visit to the Venetian Arsenal. By tradition, the lion on the left in each of these pairs is depicted roaring and is named "Stephen" in memory of Alexander Gordon Stephen. (The right hand lion is named "Stitt", after G H Stitt, Stephen's successor as Manager Shanghai.)

References

1862 births
1924 deaths
HSBC people
Members of the Executive Council of Hong Kong
Members of the Legislative Council of Hong Kong
Hong Kong bankers
Scottish bankers
Scottish expatriates in Hong Kong
Scottish expatriates in China
People from Aberdeenshire
Deaths from pneumonia in England